Zaburdyayevsky is a rural locality (a khutor) in Dobrinskoye Rural Settlement, Uryupinsky District, Volgograd Oblast, Russia. The population was 200 as of 2010. There are 6 streets.

Geography 
Zaburdyayevsky is located in steppe, 26 km northwest of Uryupinsk (the district's administrative centre) by road. Kudryashyovsky is the nearest rural locality.

References 

Rural localities in Uryupinsky District